The Latin Grammy Trustees Award is an award presented annually by the Latin Recording Academy, the same organization that distributes the Latin Grammy Awards, to individuals "who have made significant contributions, other than performance, to Latin music during their careers". Recipients can include producers, songwriters, composers, record label executives, and journalists. Award recipients are honored during "Latin Grammy Week", a string of galas prior to the annual Latin Grammy Awards ceremony. Since its inception, the award has been presented to recipients originating from Argentina, Brazil, Chile, Colombia, Cuba, the Dominican Republic, Mexico, Puerto Rico, Spain, the United States, Uruguay, and Venezuela. The award was first presented to Mexican composer and musician Manuel Esperón. Since 2005, the Trustees Awards have been presented to more than one recipient. Pierre Cossette is the only recipient of the Latin Grammy Trustees Award to also receive the Grammy Trustees Award in 1995. The accolade, along with the Person of the Year and the Lifetime Achievement awards, were not presented in 2020 due to the COVID-19 pandemic.

Recipients

 Each year is linked to an article about the Latin Grammy Awards ceremony of that year.

 The artists's occupation(s) are listed on the Special Awards page on the Latin Grammy Award website.

See also
 List of Latin Grammy Awards categories
 Grammy Trustees Award
 Latin Grammy Lifetime Achievement Award

References

General
 

Specific

External links
 Latin Grammy Awards

Awards established in 2004
Trustees Award